Oksana Marafioti (nee Kopylenko) is an American writer of Armenian and Russian Romani descent. On her father's side, she is of Servitka and Ruska Roma ancestry.

Biography
A classically trained pianist, she graduated from the University of Nevada-Las Vegas' Professional Film Crew Training Program, and worked in film before moving into writing. She is the author of American Gypsy: A Memoir (FSG, 2012). Her works have appeared in Rumpus ,Slate  and Time magazines, and in a number of literary journals and anthologies, including Literary Orphans,Story South and Immigrant Voices Vol.II (Penguin Random House, 2015). She was the 2013 BMI - Library of Congress Kluge Center Fellow and the 2020 recipient of the Picador Guest Professorship Award from the University of Leipzig, Germany. Along with many interviews and panel appearances, Oksana has presented her research on Magical Realism In Soviet Russia at the Library of Congress in 2013 and participated in the C-SPAN panel discussion on race and ethnicity in 2015. Oksana was the guest co-editor of the special 2020 issue on Romani literature for the
Critical Romani Studies Journal at the Central European University in Budapest, Hungary. In 2018, Oksana founded Lounge Writers, an online creative writing studio that offers classes by award-winning and best-selling authors to help writers of all levels explore and enhance their craft.

References

Further reading

External links 
 Oksana-Marafioti.com
 Fairy Tale Review
 Amazon
 Lounge Writers
 Atlanticist
 Diaspora In Character

American Romani people
American writers of Armenian descent
American people of Romani descent
American people of Russian descent
People of Russian-Romani descent
University of Nevada, Las Vegas alumni
Living people
Soviet emigrants to the United States
Year of birth missing (living people)
Romani writers